Benjamin Matthew Ondrus (born June 25, 1982) is a Canadian former professional ice hockey player.  Ondrus was never drafted by a National Hockey League (NHL) team, however he signed as a free agent and worked his way up through the Toronto Maple Leafs system, making his NHL debut in 2006.  Ondrus played junior hockey in the Western Hockey League for the Swift Current Broncos.  While playing in the American Hockey League for the Toronto Marlies, Ondrus served as team captain.

Playing career
Ondrus was the former captain of the Swift Current Broncos, where he was junior teammates with fellow former Toronto Maple Leafs' prospects Ian White, Wilson McCutchan and Jeremy Williams. He was signed to an American Hockey League (AHL) contract after a fine performance at the Leafs' 2003 rookie camp, and earned a contract with Toronto following an encouraging rookie AHL season with the St. John's Maple Leafs in 2003–04. Ondrus made his NHL debut on March 7, 2006, in a game against the Montreal Canadiens.

During his time in Toronto, Ondrus served as the team captain of the Toronto Marlies, the Maple Leafs' AHL affiliates.

On July 9, 2010, he signed as a free agent to a one-year contract with the Edmonton Oilers. Ondrus scored his first ever goal in an Oilers uniform on September 22, as the Oilers defeated Northwest division rivals, the Vancouver Canucks, in a pre-season warm-up at the recently renamed Rogers Arena, in Vancouver.

After a year abroad in Germany with Krefeld Pinguine of the Deutsche Eishockey Liga, Ondrus returned to North America signing as a free agent to a one-year contract with the Idaho Steelheads of the ECHL on September 12, 2012.

Career statistics

References

External links

1982 births
Living people
Canadian ice hockey right wingers
Ice hockey people from Alberta
Idaho Steelheads (ECHL) players
Idaho Steelheads (WCHL) players
Krefeld Pinguine players
Oklahoma City Barons players
St. John's Maple Leafs players
Sportspeople from Sherwood Park
Swift Current Broncos players
Toronto Maple Leafs players
Toronto Marlies players
Undrafted National Hockey League players
Canadian expatriate ice hockey players in Germany